Jose Mario (Mendoza) Meza (born November 24, 1990) is a Mexican professional baseball pitcher for the Saraperos de Saltillo of the Mexican League. Meza was selected for the Mexico national baseball team at the 2017 World Baseball Classic and 2019 Pan American Games Qualifier.

Career
On March 14, 2012, Meza signed with the Tigres de Quintana Roo of the Mexican League. On June 4, 2013, Meza was traded to the Saraperos de Saltillo. On June 3, 2014, Meza was assigned to the Leones de Yucatán. On November 15, 2016, Meza signed a minor league contract with the Chicago Cubs organization. On March 30, 2017, Meza was assigned to the Leones. On August 14, 2018, he was assigned to the Saraperos de Saltillo, and was released by the Cubs organization on March 18, 2019. On October 4, 2019, Meza was returned to the Leones by the Saraperos. Meza did not play in a game in 2020 due to the cancellation of the Mexican League season because of the COVID-19 pandemic. In 2021, Meza's rights were acquired by the Saraperos de Saltillo.

References

External links

1990 births
Living people
Águilas de Mexicali players
Baseball players from Sinaloa
Leones de Yucatán players
Mexican baseball players
Mexican League baseball pitchers
Saraperos de Saltillo players
Tigres de Quintana Roo players
2017 World Baseball Classic players